Louis Talpe (born 22 May 1981) is a Belgian actor. He is known for playing Toby on the Studio 100 show Mega Mindy and has appeared most recently as Eliab on the ABC-produced drama Of Kings and Prophets.

Career
Talpe was born in Kortemark and performed in guest roles including in the shows 16+, Spring, The Kotmadam and Rupel. In 2006, he landed a role as Toby in Mega Mindy, a production of Studio 100. From September 2008 to January 2009, Talpe was busy shooting the VRT series Goesting.

On 5 March 2012, Talpe appeared as Mike Brandt in the soap opera Good times, bad times. On 29 August 2013, it was announced that Talpe would play the role of DJ Lo-Tus in the television show Love with Ibiza.

In 2015, he played the role of Roel Thevange in the TV show Spitbroers. He will be playing Vincent in the upcoming film Wat Mannen Willen (2015), his first role in a film for a long time.

Television

Fixed roles

Film

Musicals 
There are now two musicals produced of the show Mega Mindy. Talpe performed in these two musicals as agent Toby. The first musical, Mega Mindy and the Brilliant Emerald ran between 2008 and 2009 in both Belgium and the Netherlands. This was followed by Mega Mindy and the Doll Master in 2010.

In 2014, Talpe starred in the musical spectacle '14 -'18.

References

External links
 Official website

Flemish male film actors
Flemish male television actors
1981 births
Living people
21st-century Flemish male actors